Shiloh Valley Township is located in St. Clair County, Illinois. As of the 2010 census, its population was 11,631 and it contained 4,284 housing units. Shiloh Valley Township was originally called Shiloh before its name was changed on an unknown date.

Geography

Demographics

References

External links
City-data.com
St. Clair County Official Site
Illinois State Archives

Townships in St. Clair County, Illinois
Townships in Illinois